Christopher James Chichele "Chich" Hewitt was dean of Grahamstown from 1993 to 1998; and also archdeacon of Grahamstown during the same period.

Hewitt was born in 1945, educated at the University of the Witwatersrand and ordained in 1979. His first post was as chaplain at St Paul's College Grahamstown. After many years in South Africa he came to England in 1999 as Team Rector of Radcliffe, serving for a decade. He was then at Holy Rood, Swinton until 2014. He is now retired.

Notes

1945 births
University of the Witwatersrand alumni
Deans of Grahamstown
Anglican archdeacons in Africa
Living people
Academic staff of St Paul's College, Grahamstown